Royapuram is a locality in the northern part of the city of Chennai, Tamil Nadu, India. It is best known for its beach, and for Royapuram Railway Station. The station is the first railway station of south India, opening in 1856, and is today the oldest surviving railway station of the Indian subcontinent

History
The region existed as a well known settlement during the Chola times, but the name Royapuram is derived from a Tamil appellation for St. Peter, Royappa, in connection with St. Peter's Church in the area. The region was originally called  Rayarapuram named after  the Rayar Kings who rules down South. It is also believed that the British / Anglo Indias settled in this locality were called Rayars  which lent the name Rayarpuram

From the 14th century, the erstwhile Vijayanagara Rulers controlled this region till the Madras land grant to Francis Day.

Royapuram Railway Station was the first railway station constructed in South India and second railway line in South Asia. The first train service commenced in 1856 from here to Arcot, the then capital of the Carnatic region.

Politics

State assembly politics

Lok Sabha politics
Royapuram assembly constituency is part of Chennai North (Lok Sabha constituency).

References

Neighbourhoods in Chennai
Coastal neighbourhoods of Chennai